Napisten Hava is the seventh studio album of the Hungarian folk metal band Dalriada. A videoclip for "A Dudás" was released 17 September 2012.

The album peaked at position 3 in the Top 40 albums chart of Hungary.

Track listing

 *Nándorfehérvár is the old Hungarian name of the capital city of Serbia, Belgrade.

Personnel
Dalriada
 Laura Binder – vocals
 András Ficzek – vocals, guitars
 Mátyás Németh-Szabó – guitar
 István Molnár – bass
 Barnabás Ungár – keyboards, backing vocals
 Tadeusz Rieckmann – drums, harsh vocals, backing vocals

Additional and session musicians
 Attila Fajkusz – violin, tambourine, backing vocals
 Ernő Szőke – doublebass
 Gergely Szőke – viola, lute, acoustic guitars
 Ádám Csete – bagpipe

References

2012 albums
Dalriada (band) albums